The Bahama yellowthroat (Geothlypis rostrata) is a New World warbler. It is a resident breeder endemic to the Bahamas.

Taxonomy
It is closely related to common yellowthroat, Altamira yellowthroat and Belding's yellowthroat, and is also considered conspecific with these taxa.

Subspecies
Three subspecies have been recognised:
Geothlypis rostrata rostrata
Geothlypis rostrata tanneri
Geothlypis rostrata coryi

Description
Bahama yellowthroat is 15 cm long with a large bill. The adult male of the nominate race G. r. rostrata, found on Andros and New Providence islands has an olive-green back and mainly yellow underparts, slightly paler on the belly. It has a black facemask and grey forecrown. The female is similar, but lacks the black mask and has a grey crown; she may have a whiter belly.

The adult male of G. r. tanneri, found on Grand Bahama, Great Abaco and associated islands, has a yellow tinge to the forecrown band, and G. r. coryi  of Eleuthera and Cat islands has a mainly yellow forecrown.

The Bahama yellowthroat can be distinguished from wintering common yellowthroats by its greater size, heavier bill and slower, more deliberate movements. Males additionally have more extensively yellow underparts, a larger facemask extending onto the nape, and in the case of coryi the distinctive yellow forecrown. Females have a grey wash to the head not shown by common yellowthroat.

The song of Bahama yellowthroat is a loud wichety wichety wichety wich, similar to that of common yellowthroat. The call is a softer jip than that of common yellowthroat.

Ecology
The breeding habitat of the Bahama yellowthroat is dense dry or damp low scrub, usually drier than the areas used by wintering common yellowthroats. It builds a cup nest low in dense vegetation or a tree stump, and lays two eggs.  Like other yellowthroats, it forages low in vegetation and feeds on insects and other small invertebrates.

Conservation
This species is common, but is outnumbered in winter by migrant common yellowthroats.

References

New World Warblers by Curson, Jon; Beadle, David and Quinn, David. 1994. London : Christopher Helm. 

Bahama yellowthroat
Endemic birds of the Bahamas
Bahama yellowthroat
Bahama yellowthroat